Arshad Khan is a multiple-award-winning Pakistani-Canadian filmmaker, most noted for his 2017 feature documentary Abu.

He studied at the Mel Hoppenheim School of Cinema in Montreal, Quebec, Canada. He has made a number of short films since graduating, including shorts Threadbare (2008), Brownie (2011), Doggoned (2012), Zen (2012) and Valery's Suitcase (2016).

Abu is Khan's long feature directorial debut, in which he tackles his relationship with his family and his own sexual orientation, taking viewers through tense times particularly with his father ("abu" means father in Urdu). The film is also about clash of conservative and liberal values and about modernity versus familiarity and traditions. The film had its world premiere at the Los Angeles Film Festival in 2017.

Khan established "gray matter productions" in partnership with producer Miguel Jimenez. The company creates "cinematic content serving to uplift humanity".

He has also been the director of the Mosaic International South Asian Film Festival.

References

External links

Canadian documentary film directors
Pakistani documentary film directors
Living people
Pakistani emigrants to Canada
LGBT film directors
Canadian male screenwriters
21st-century Canadian screenwriters
Canadian LGBT screenwriters
Year of birth missing (living people)
21st-century Canadian LGBT people
Concordia University alumni
Canadian gay writers
Gay screenwriters